The Organ Concerto, Op. 7 is an organ concerto by Icelandic composer Jón Leifs. Its origins go back to 1917, when Leifs was just 18, and was completed in 1930. It is an uncompromisingly dark work somewhat linked to medieval music, with influences from the tvísöngur tradition in a dissonant triadic context. It contains three movements, with a short introduction and finale framing a much longer Passacaglia consisting in thirty variations. Its theme comprises the total chromatic, critic Alex Ross described as Bach walking in the tundra.

A performance of the work in March 1941 in the Sing-Akademie zu Berlin caused a scandal, with only twenty spectators remaining in the hall by the end and critic Fritz Stege condemning Leifs' "agonizingly narrow-minded intellectual world". This marked the end of the Icelandic composer's career in Nazi Germany, though he was not allowed to leave the country until 1944.

Instrumentation
The concerto is scored for solo organ, piccolo, flute, oboe, cor anglais, clarinet, bass clarinet, bassoon, contrabassoon, 2 horns, 2 trumpets, trombone, tuba, timpani, bass drum, cymbals, tam-tam, large woodblock/hammer, snare drum, triangle (3 percussion players required) and strings.

Structure

The movements are played without pauses. The work lasts about 20 minutes.

Recordings
Björn Steinar Solbergsson // Iceland Symphony Orchestra — En Shao. BIS, 1999.

References

Compositions by Jón Leifs
1930 compositions
Leifs